Pen y Garn is a mountain in the Cambrian Mountains, Mid Wales standing at 611 metres above sea level.

Pen y Garn tops a 500–600 m high plateau, which includes the controversial Cefn Croes wind farm. The summit has a very large shelter cairn hollowed out from the remains of an ancient burial cairn and a trig point. The wind turbines are very near the summit. To the north some 10 km, the whole Plynlimon range can be seen, including the summits of Y Garn, Pen Pumlumon Fawr, Pen Pumlumon Llygad-bychan and Pen Pumlumon Arwystli. 21 km to the west is the town of Aberystwyth; Drygarn Fawr lies 20 km to the SSE .

References

Hewitts of Wales
Marilyns of Wales
Nuttalls
Mountains and hills of Ceredigion
Elenydd